Events from the year 1200 in Ireland.

Incumbent
Lord: John

Events
 Irish exchequer created.
 Theobald Walter, 1st Baron Butler is thought to have founded the Abbey of Woney or Wotheny in County Limerick Ireland around this time.
 John Comyn, Archbishop of Dublin, granted the church at Garristown to Llanthony Priory

Births

Deaths

References